The Light Is Seeping Through the Cracks is a studio album released by American rock band Harris in September 2005. The album was independently recorded, produced, and released by the band. The album's release was followed by a self-booked tour of the United States and Canada.

Track list
All songs written and produced by Harris.
 "Solid Ground" (2:39)
 "Like Origami" (3:36)
 "Last Sentiment" (3:02)
 "Carousel" (3:27)
 "New Color" (5:15)
 "Some Kind of Gospel" (4:15)
 "Worse Company" (5:15)
 "Pace of Change" (4:54)
 "Not What We Used to Be" (3:00)
 "Too Young to Go" (5:34)
 "Silent Treatment" (3:16)
 "Captain" (8:17)

Personnel

Harris
 Jon Day – guitar
 Rob Lynch – drums, percussion
 Mike Nastri – vocals, bass
 Jim Reed – keyboards, vocals
 Matthew Scott – guitar

Additional musicians
 Eli Cohn – strings (track 8)
 Bob Mallory – strings (track 8)
 Michael Matta – string arrangement (track 8)

Production
 Matt Azevedo – mastering
 Jon Day – engineering (tracks 1–7, 9–12)
 Rick Kwan – engineering (track 8)
 Dan McCarthy – artwork

References

External links
 The Light Is Seeping Through the Cracks at Last.fm

2005 albums
Self-released albums
Harris (band) albums